The Caldron (often misspelled Cauldron), at 853 Natoma Street in San Francisco, in the South of Market St. area, was a gay sex club which opened in 1980 and closed in 1984. It was called "the epitome of the uninhibited, abandoned, 'sleazy' sex club."

Description
Located in a converted warehouse, the site was unabashedly a place where men went to have sex. Patrons were required to be naked except for footwear; a clothes check was provided. Like other similar venues, it had no alcohol license; patrons brought their own alcohol, usually beer, and this was stored in a cooler and patrons given chits that they could turn in for a can of the brand of beer they had brought. It was described as "exemplary" as one of the first venues to promote safe sex as the AIDS crisis hit.

The owners were Hal Slate and Stephen Gilman. The club had two bathtubs for those who wanted to be urinated on. The lights were not dimmed. There were tables and benches for having sex on, and slings. The Caldron featured thematic nights: Tuesdays were for water sports, Thursday for fisting; it also set aside nights for masturbation. A poster announcing its First Anniversary Orgy has been preserved. The name Caldron, according to owner Gilman, was the I Ching's commentary on itself.

Slate and Gilman were members of the San Francisco Gay Men's Chorus, which after Monday chorus rehearsals sometimes repaired to the Caldron for a private party. Opera music was the background. The San Francisco Jacks, a masturbation club, met at the Caldron.

References

1980 establishments in California
1984 disestablishments in California
Entertainment companies established in 1980
Entertainment companies disestablished in 1984
Gay bathhouses in California
Gay male BDSM
History of San Francisco
Sexuality in San Francisco
South of Market, San Francisco